Trade is a 2007 drama film directed by Marco Kreuzpaintner and starring Kevin Kline. It was produced by Roland Emmerich and Rosilyn Heller. The film premiered January 23, 2007 at the 2007 Sundance Film Festival and opened in limited release on September 28, 2007. It is based on Peter Landesman's article "The Girls Next Door" about sex slaves, which was featured as the cover story in the January 24, 2004 issue of The New York Times Magazine.

Plot

The film follows two people who are kidnapped by an international sexual slavery gang in Mexico City. Adriana (Gaitán), a 13-year-old local girl, is captured while riding her bike. Veronica (Bachleda), a young woman from Poland, is kidnapped upon arriving at the airport. She soon realizes that the whole trip was orchestrated by the gang. They are held along with some Latin American women and a young Thai boy.    

Adriana's 17-year-old brother, Jorge, learns that his sister was kidnapped. He asks his friends to help him find her, but they balk when they learn how powerful the gang is. Jorge finds out that the kidnappers "sell" their victims as sex slaves through a connection in New Jersey. While searching for Adriana, he sees her among the other victims as they are hurried into a van by the kidnappers. He steals his friends' car and manages to follow the van to Juárez, but then loses track of it. 

Adriana, Veronica and the Thai boy are smuggled into the US with the help of corrupt Mexican policemen, but the group is caught by the US Border Patrol. The gang members keep the kidnapped people from telling the police that they were kidnapped by threatening to harm their families. The kidnappers and victims are sent back to Mexico, after which they sneak into the US again.

When Jorge finds the house in Juárez where the victims were kept, they are already gone. An American, Ray (Kline), also arrives to investigate the house. Jorge hides in the trunk of his car, revealing himself once they have crossed back into Texas. Ray decides to help Jorge to rescue his sister. Jorge learns that Ray was in Juárez to search for his estranged daughter, who may have also been a victim of the gang. They travel to New Jersey, where the victims are being taken and where an internet auction will be held to sell them to the highest bidder. At a rest-stop diner with Ray, Jorge recognizes the young boy. Ray frees him and forces the man who had purchased him to give him access to the auction.

At a stop, Adriana and Veronica manage to escape. Veronica sees a policeman and tells Adriana to tell him what is happening, while Veronica herself phones her parents in Poland to tell them, but learns that her little son has already been taken by the criminal organization. Adriana fails to tell the policeman, and during the phone call Adriana and Veronica are recaptured by the kidnappers. At another stop, Veronica commits suicide by jumping from a cliff, telling the kidnapper that he will pay for his sins. The kidnapper arrives with Adriana at a house where his boss keeps more victims. She scolds him for losing Veronica.

Ray and Jorge ask the New Jersey police to free Adriana, but they refuse; it would disrupt their strategy against the gang's larger criminal organization. Ray, assisted by Jorge, then participates in the auction and buys the girl for $32,000, to free her. Ray brings the money to the house, but asks the gang boss a personal question, which makes her suspicious. He then has to prove that he is not a cop by having sex with Adriana before leaving. Instead, Ray and Adriana convince the male kidnapper to let them leave. The police, checking on the house after all, arrest the two kidnappers and free several children they find in the basement. The siblings are flown back to Mexico City, where Adriana is joyfully reunited with her mother, and Jorge seeks revenge.

Cast
Kevin Kline as Ray Sheridan, a fraud investigator who helps Jorge search for his sister when he finds him.
Cesar Ramos as Jorge, the trouble making 17-year-old brother of Adriana.
Alicja Bachleda as Veronica, a Polish tourist who is kidnapped.
Paulina Gaitán as Adriana, Jorge's younger sister who is also kidnapped.
Marco Pérez as Manuelo
Linda Emond as Patty Sheridan
Zack Ward as Alex Green
Kate del Castillo as Laura
Tim Reid as Hank Jefferson
Pasha D. Lychnikoff as Vadim Youchenko
Natalia Traven as Lupe
Leland Pascual as Thai Boy, a ten-year-old boy who is also kidnapped. He is the only boy that was kidnapped.

Critical reception
Trade received mixed to negative reviews from critics. On review aggregator website Rotten Tomatoes, the film holds a 34% approval rating, based on 73 reviews with an average rating of 5/10. The website's critics consensus reads: "With an exploitative style that seems more suited for TV shows like CSI, Trades message about the reality of child exploitation is easily lost". On Metacritic, the film had an average score of 42 out of 100, based on 22 reviews indicating "mixed or average reviews".

Robert Koehler of Variety said that "With all of the earmarks of being a serious and thoughtful drama written and based on Peter Landesman's investigative work on the international sex slave trade network, it comes as something of a shock to discover that the final film is little more than a exploitative thriller".

Jeannette Catsoulis of The New York Times called Trade "[a]n eagerly prurient dip into the sex-trafficking trough", adding that "[it] teeters between earnest exposé and salacious melodrama, but criticizing film's "near-visible weight of conscience", which if not for it, would have guaranteed a success in the second category.

Box office performance
The film opened in limited release in the United States and Canada on September 28, 2007 and grossed an estimated $114,000 in 90 theaters, an average of $1,266 per theater.

See also

Abduction of Chloe Ayling

References

External links
Official site
Official German site with additional information

Trade at sundance.org
Official trailer hosted by Apple

2007 drama films
2000s American films
2000s drama road movies
2000s English-language films
2000s German films
American drama road movies
English-language German films
Films about human trafficking in the United States
Films about prostitution in the United States
Films based on newspaper and magazine articles
Films directed by Marco Kreuzpaintner
Films set in Mexico City
Films set in New Jersey
Films set in Texas
Films shot in New Jersey
Films shot in New Mexico
German drama road movies
Human commodity auctions
Lionsgate films
Roadside Attractions films
Works about sex trafficking